The enzyme 3-chloro-D-alanine dehydrochlorinase (EC 4.5.1.2) catalyzes the reaction

 3-chloro-D-alanine + H2O = pyruvate + chloride + NH3 (overall reaction)
(1a) 3-chloro-D-alanine = chloride + 2-aminoprop-2-enoate
(1b) 2-aminoprop-2-enoate = 2-iminopropanoate (spontaneous)
(1c) 2-iminopropanoate + H2O = pyruvate + NH3 (spontaneous)

This enzyme belongs to the family of lyases, specifically the class of carbon-halide lyases.  The systematic name of this enzyme class is 3-chloro-D-alanine chloride-lyase (deaminating; pyruvate-forming). Other names in common use include β-chloro-D-alanine dehydrochlorinase, and 3-chloro-D-alanine chloride-lyase (deaminating).  It employs one cofactor, pyridoxal phosphate.

References 

 
 

EC 4.5.1
Pyridoxal phosphate enzymes
Enzymes of unknown structure